Alsónémedi is a village in Pest County, Budapest metropolitan area, Hungary. It had a population of 5,205 in 2015.

External links

  in Hungarian

Populated places in Pest County
Budapest metropolitan area